This is a list of programs broadcast by JTBC.

Award shows
 Baeksang Arts Awards (2012–present)
 Golden Disc Awards (2007–present)

News/current affairs programming
 Newsroom Now (April 16, 2018–present)
  (November 14, 2022–present)
 JTBC Newsroom (September 22, 2014–present)
 Lee Kyu-yeon's Spotlight (May 31, 2015–present)
 Political Desk (April 7, 2014–present)
 Scandal Supervisor (September 22, 2014–present)
 Ssulzun Live (June 7, 2021–present)
 Footage vs Footage Korea (August 12, 2021–present)
 A Week Ahead Korea (2022, based on 'Itogi Nedeli')
  (September 16, 2013-present)

Scripted programming

Monday–Friday
Morning soap opera
 When Women Powder Twice (December 5, 2011 – March 7, 2012)

Daily sitcom
 Living Among the Rich (December 5, 2011 – August 3, 2012)

Daily late-night drama
 Flower of Revenge (February 4 – August 1, 2013)
 Can't Stand Anymore (August 5, 2013 – January 9, 2014)
 The Noblesse (January 13 – July 4, 2014)

Monday–Tuesday

 Padam Padam (December 5, 2011 – February 7, 2012)
 Syndrome (February 13 – April 17, 2012)
 Happy Ending (April 23 – July 16, 2012)
 Can We Get Married? (October 29, 2012 – January 1, 2013)
 Heartless City (May 27 – July 30, 2013)
 Love in Her Bag (August 5 – October 8, 2013)
 Your Neighbor's Wife (October 14 – December 24, 2013) 
 Can We Fall in Love, Again? (January 6 – March 11, 2014)
 Secret Affair (March 17 – May 13, 2014)
 Steal Heart (May 19 – November 11, 2014)
 Rain or Shine (December 11, 2017 – January 30, 2018)
 Welcome to Waikiki (February 5 – April 17, 2018)
 Ms. Hammurabi (May 21 – July 16, 2018)
 Life (July 23 – September 11, 2018)
 The Beauty Inside (October 1 – November 20, 2018)
 Clean with Passion for Now (November 26, 2018 – February 4, 2019)
 The Light in Your Eyes (February 11 – March 19, 2019)
 Welcome to Waikiki 2 (March 25 – May 15, 2019)
 The Wind Blows (May 27 – July 16, 2019)
 At Eighteen (July 22 – September 10, 2019)
 Flower Crew: Joseon Marriage Agency (September 16 – November 5, 2019)
 Chief of Staff 2 (November 11 – December 10, 2019)
 Diary of a Prosecutor (December 16, 2019 – February 11, 2020)
 When the Weather Is Fine (February 24 – April 21, 2020)
 Sweet Munchies (May 25 – June 30, 2020)
 The Good Detective (July 6 – August 25, 2020)
 18 Again (September 21 – November 10, 2020)
 She Would Never Know (January 18 – March 9, 2021)
 Idol: The Coup (November 8 – December 14, 2021)
  The One and Only (December 20, 2021 – February 8, 2022)

Tuesday
 Schoolgirl Detectives (December 16, 2014 – March 17, 2015)
 Live On (November 17, 2020 – January 12, 2021)

Wednesday–Thursday

 Kimchi Family (December 7, 2011 – February 23, 2012)
 How Long I've Kissed (February 29 – April 19, 2012)
 Love Again (April 25 – June 14, 2012)
 To My Beloved (June 27 – August 16, 2012)
 Mystic Pop-up Bar (May 20 – June 25, 2020)
 Was It Love? (July 8 – September 2, 2020)
 Private Lives (October 7 – November 26, 2020)
 Run On (December 16, 2020 – February 4, 2021)
 Sisyphus: The Myth (February 17 – April 8, 2021)
 Law School (April 14 – June 9, 2021)
 Monthly Magazine Home (June 16 – August 5, 2021)
 Reflection of You (October 13 – December 2, 2021)
 Artificial City (December 8, 2021 – February 10, 2022) 
 Thirty-Nine (February 16 – March 31, 2022)
 Green Mothers' Club (April 6 – May 26, 2022)
 Insider (June 8 – July 28, 2022)
 The Interest of Love (December 21, 2022 – February 9, 2023)
 The Good Bad Mother (April 26, 2023)

Friday–Saturday

 More Than a Maid (January 23 – March 28, 2015)
 Beating Again (April 3 – May 23, 2015)
 This Is My Love (May 29 – July 18, 2015)
 Last (July 24 – September 12, 2015)
 D-Day (September 18 – November 21, 2015)
 Madame Antoine: The Love Therapist (January 22 – March 12, 2016)
 My Horrible Boss (March 18 – May 7, 2016)
 Secret Healer (May 13 – July 16, 2016)
 Hello, My Twenties! (July 22 – August 27, 2016)
 Fantastic (September 2 – October 22, 2016)
 Listen to Love (October 28 – December 3, 2016)
 Solomon's Perjury (December 9, 2016 – January 15, 2017)
 Strong Girl Bong-soon (January 21 – April 15, 2017)
 Man to Man (April 21 – June 10, 2017)
 The Lady in Dignity (June 16 – August 19, 2017) 
 Hello, My Twenties! 2 (August 25 – October 7, 2017)
 The Package (October 13 – November 18, 2017)
 Untouchable (November 24, 2017 – January 20, 2018)
 Misty (February 2 – March 24, 2018)
 Something in the Rain (March 30 – May 19, 2018)
 Sketch (May 25 – July 14, 2018)
 Gangnam Beauty (July 27 – September 15, 2018)
 The Third Charm (September 28 – November 17, 2018)
 Sky Castle (November 23, 2018 – February 1, 2019)
 Legal High (February 8 – March 30, 2019)
 Beautiful World (April 5 – May 25, 2019)
 Chief of Staff (June 14 – July 13, 2019)
 Be Melodramatic (August 9 – September 28, 2019)
 My Country: The New Age (October 4 – November 23, 2019)
 Chocolate (November 29, 2019 – January 18, 2020)
 Itaewon Class (January 31 – March 21, 2020)
 The World of the Married (March 27 – May 16, 2020)
 Graceful Friends (July 10 – September 5, 2020)
 More Than Friends (September 25 – November 28, 2020)
 Hush (December 11, 2020 – February 6, 2021)
 Beyond Evil (February 19 – April 10, 2021)
 Undercover (April 23 – June 12, 2021)

Friday–Sunday
 Reborn Rich (November 18 – December 25, 2022)

Saturday
 Monster (March 31, 2012)
 Nevertheless (June 19 – August 21, 2021)

Saturday–Sunday
 Lost (September 4 – October 24, 2021)
 Inspector Koo (October 30 – December 12, 2021)
 Snowdrop (December 18, 2021 – January 30, 2022) 
 Forecasting Love and Weather (February 12 – April 3, 2022)
 My Liberation Notes (April 9 – May 29, 2022)
 Cleaning Up (June 4 – July 24, 2022)
 The Good Detective 2 (July 30 – September 18, 2022)
 The Empire (September 24 – November 13, 2022)
 Agency (January 7 – February 26, 2023)
 Divorce Attorney Shin (March 4, 2023 – present)
 Doctor Cha (April 15, 2023)

Weekend soap operas
 Insu, The Queen Mother (December 3, 2011 – June 24, 2012)
 My Kids Give Me a Headache (October 27, 2012 – March 17, 2013)
 Blooded Palace: The War of Flowers (March 23 – September 8, 2013)
 The Eldest (September 14, 2013 – March 16, 2014)
 12 Years Promise (March 22 – June 29, 2014)

Weekend specials
 The End of the World (March 16 – May 5, 2013)
 Songgot: The Piercer (October 24 – November 29, 2015)

Special
 Drama Festa (October 2, 2017 – present)

Unscripted programming

Current

Former

See also

 List of programs broadcast by Arirang TV
 List of programmes broadcast by Korean Broadcasting System
 List of programs broadcast by Munhwa Broadcasting Corporation
 List of programs broadcast by Seoul Broadcasting System
 List of Shinhwa Broadcast episodes
 List of programs broadcast by tvN

Notes

References

 
JTBC
JTBC